The Ministry of Regional Development of Tunisia is a cabinet-level governmental agency in Tunisia. The position of Regional Development Minister leads the agency and has been held by Democratic Progressive Party leader, Ahmed Najib Chebbi, since 17 January 2011 following the 2010-2011 Tunisian Protests.

Politics of Tunisia
Government ministries of Tunisia

2011 establishments in Tunisia
Ministries established in 2011